Events from the year 1699 in the Kingdom of Scotland.

Incumbents 
 Monarch – William II
 Secretary of State – James Ogilvy, 1st Earl of Seafield, jointly with John Carmichael, 1st Earl of Hyndford (from 31 January)

Law officers 
 Lord Advocate – Sir James Stewart
 Solicitor General for Scotland – Sir Patrick Hume

Judiciary 
 Lord President of the Court of Session – Lord North Berwick 
 Lord Justice General – Lord Lothian
 Lord Justice Clerk – Lord Ormiston, then Lord Pollok

Events 
 12 January – James Sutherland is appointed first Regius Keeper of the Royal Botanic Garden Edinburgh and first King's Botanist.
 2 March – The Edinburgh Gazette is first published.
 July – Darien scheme: The colony of New Edinburgh on the Gulf of Darién is abandoned; the colonists set out to return to Scotland.
 September – Darien scheme: The second expedition to Darien sets sail, unaware of the failure of the first.
 23 September – A total solar eclipse affects the North-East of the country, including Wick.

Births 
 2 February – Hugh MacDonald, bishop (died 1773)
 13 April – Alexander Ross, poet (died 1784)
 17 April – Robert Blair, poet (died 1746)
 19 April – John Farquharson, Jesuit (died 1746)
 31 May – Alexander Cruden, Biblical scholar (died 1770 in London)
Date unknown
 John Dalrymple, Member of Parliament for Wigtown Burghs, 1728–34  (died 1742)
 William Ged, goldsmith, inventor of stereotyping (died 1782)

Deaths 
 29 November – Patrick Gordon, general in the Russian Army (born 1635)

See also 
 Timeline of Scottish history

References 

 
Years of the 17th century in Scotland
1690s in Scotland